Parry may refer to:

People 
 Parry (surname)
 Parry (given name)

Fictional characters 
 Parry, protagonist of the movie The Fisher King, played by Robin Williams
 Parry in the series Incarnations of Immortality by Piers Anthony
 The Hero's son in Dragon Quest V

Places

Canada 
 Parry, Saskatchewan, a hamlet
 Cape Parry, Northwest Territories
 Parry Peninsula, Northwest Territories
 Parry Channel, Nunavut
 Parry Sound, Georgian Bay, Ontario
 Parry Island in Georgian Bay, Ontario; see Wasauksing First Nation
 Parry Islands, former name of the Queen Elizabeth Islands
 Parry Passage, between Langara and Graham Islands, Haida Gwaii, British Columbia

Elsewhere 
 Parry Peak, a part of the Rocky Mountains, in Colorado, United States
 Parry County, New South Wales, Australia
 Mount Parry, Antarctica
 Parry Point, Coats Land, Antarctica
 Parry Island, part of Enewetak Atoll in the Pacific Ocean
 Parry (crater), on the Moon

Other uses 
 Parry (fencing), a maneuver in fencing
 PARRY, a simulation program in artificial intelligence
 Parry People Movers, a British manufacturer of lightweight trams and railcars
 Parry Auto Company, an early, short-lived American manufacturer
 Parry House (disambiguation), various houses on the US National Register of Historic Places
 Parry Field, a defunct baseball stadium in Belmont, Western Australia
 EID Parry, a public company in South India

See also 
 Perry (disambiguation)
 Parry Pinyon, a kind of pine tree
 Penstemon parryi or Parry's Penstemon, a perennial flowering shrub
 Graves' disease, also known as Parry's disease